Enola Holmes 2 is a 2022 mystery film and the sequel to the 2020 film Enola Holmes, both of which star Millie Bobby Brown as the title character, the teenage sister of the already-famous Victorian-era detective Sherlock Holmes. The film is directed by Harry Bradbeer from a screenplay by Jack Thorne that adapts the book series The Enola Holmes Mysteries by Nancy Springer. Unlike its predecessor, the film does not adapt one of Springer's novels and instead takes real-life inspiration from the 1888 matchgirls' strike. In addition to Brown, Henry Cavill, Louis Partridge, Susie Wokoma, Adeel Akhtar, and Helena Bonham Carter reprise their supporting roles, while David Thewlis and Sharon Duncan-Brewster join the cast.

Filming began in Autumn 2021 and ended in January 2022. Enola Holmes 2 was released on November 4, 2022, by Netflix. The film received positive reviews from critics and topped Netflix's viewership charts in 93 countries.

Plot
Enola starts her own detective agency but struggles to get clients, unlike her famous detective brother Sherlock Holmes. A factory girl named Bessie asks Enola to help find her missing sister Sarah Chapman. Bessie takes Enola to the match factory, which is experiencing a deadly typhus epidemic, and encounters Mae, who worked alongside the sisters.

Enola follows Mae to the Paragon Theatre where Mae and Sarah work as dancers. She finds a letter written to Sarah by a secret lover. On her way home, Enola comes across a drunken Sherlock and brings him home to 221B Baker Street. He is struggling to solve his latest case involving the blackmail of government officials, but he cannot trace the owner of the accounts where the money is sent. 

Enola deduces that the poem is a code leading to a home in Whitechapel. There, she finds Mae dying of a stab wound. Enola discovers a piece of sheet music in Mae's dress but is interrupted by Superintendent Grail who accuses her of murder. Enola escapes to Sherlock's flat and deduces that Sarah's lover will be at a ball hosted by the Lyon family.

There, she meets Cicely, a friendly noblewoman, and Mira Troy, secretary to Treasury Minister Lord Charles McIntyre. Enola meets Tewkesbury, who teaches her how to dance so she can find an opportunity to get closer to William Lyon, the son of the match factory's owner and Sarah's lover. Meanwhile, Sherlock pieces together a message in the blackmail scheme from its mastermind Moriarty. Enola is arrested by Grail before she can speak with William, but Sherlock enlists their mother Eudoria and her fellow radical suffragette Edith to break Enola out of prison.

While visiting Tewkesbury, Enola realizes that Sarah is Cicely and that she, Mae, and William had discovered that white phosphorus, not typhus, was killing the workers and were planning to expose it. Tewkesbury and Enola confess their love for each other. They head to the factory, where they meet Sherlock and find William dead with a corner of the sheet music. The three deduce Lord McIntyre had struck a deal with William's father to use cheap phosphorus to increase profit. 

The group heads to the Paragon after realizing the full sheet music was a map of the theatre. There, Sarah confirms Enola's findings and admits she and William needed Tewkesbury's help to expose McIntyre. Grail and several policemen arrive and a fight ensues, resulting in Grail falling to his death. Lord McIntyre arrives with Lestrade. He burns the evidence of the dealings and attempts to have Sarah arrested, but Sherlock and Enola deduce that Mira Troy is Moriarty and is responsible for the blackmail and murder. Mira is taken into custody. 

Sarah, Bessie, and Enola inform the factory's match girls of the events and convince them to strike. McIntyre is arrested with Tewkesbury's help, while Moriarty escapes police custody. Enola sets up a new office at Edith's shop; Tewkesbury has begun courting her in earnest, and he invites Enola to a ball.

Cast

Production

In September 2020, co-producer and star Millie Bobby Brown and director Harry Bradbeer acknowledged their intentions to develop a sequel to Enola Holmes. The story is an original story based on the real 1888 matchgirls' strike and the life of labour activist Sarah Chapman. Bradbeer thought it was an inspiring feminist tale, and it showed the theme of working together — "Enola, to advance, has to work with others and not just be reliant on herself. It's a story that goes from 'I' to 'we', and that is a story of sisterhood."

In April 2021, a sequel was reportedly in development, with Brown and Cavill reprising their roles as Enola Holmes and Sherlock Holmes. Sam Claflin was unable to return as Mycroft Holmes due to scheduling conflicts, much to the sadness of Bradbeer and the crew, though Mycroft's absence allowed them to concentrate more on Sherlock. In May 2021, the project was officially confirmed by Netflix. Brown was reportedly paid $10 million for her role, making it the highest upfront salary for an actor under the age of 20 as of the release of the film.

Production and filming began in Autumn 2021. Scenes were filmed in Hull in October 2021, and Cavill wrapped filming that November. Filming concluded on January 7, 2022.

Music

Reception

Enola Holmes 2 debuted at number 1 on Netflix's global weekly viewership with 64.08 million hours streamed across 93 countries. The next week the film stayed at the number 1 spot with 62.860 million hours. Interest in the first film Enola Holmes, generated another 9.64 million hours viewed for the first week of the sequel release.

 

Beandrea July of The New York Times wrote "One can't help but cheer on this Y.A. feminist tale as a welcome addition to the Sherlock Holmes universe."
Lovia Gyarkye of The Hollywood Reporter called it "a serviceable sequel". Gyarkye praises the meticulous production and costume design but is critical of the narrative as "The 1888 match girl strike, which was a process of community building, a focused effort on we, gets repackaged as a lesson in one voice leading the masses."

Benjamin Lee of The Guardian gave it 3 out of 5 and wrote: "An equally boisterous romp that's equally as hard to remember once it's over but one that should keep its many fans engaged enough to warrant further sequels." 
Robbie Collin of The Telegraph gave it 2 out of 5. He found the film less charming than its predecessor and was critical of "the overall aura of cheapness" and from the dreary looking scenes to the basic fight scenes.

Accolades
Millie Bobby Brown won the award for "Favorite Movie Actress" at the 2023 Kids' Choice Awards.

References

External links
 
 

2022 films
2020s American films
2020s British films
2020s English-language films
American detective films
American mystery films
American sequel films
British detective films
British mystery films
British sequel films
English-language Netflix original films
Films about missing people
Films about siblings
Films based on American novels
Films based on mystery novels
Films based on young adult literature
Films directed by Harry Bradbeer
Films scored by Daniel Pemberton
Films set in London
Films shot in Kingston upon Hull
Films with screenplays by Jack Thorne
Legendary Pictures films
Sherlock Holmes films
Teen mystery films